John William Sinclair (September 3, 1879 – after 1943) was a farmer and politician in Ontario, Canada. He represented Bruce in the Legislative Assembly of Ontario from 1934 to 1943 as a Liberal.

The son of Duncan Sinclair and Sarah Ann Linn, he was born in Sullivan township, Grey County. In 1905, he married the daughter of Robert Neil. Sinclair served as reeve or Arran township and was warden for Bruce County in 1924.

References 

1879 births
Year of death missing
Ontario Liberal Party MPPs